The 2012–13 Kent Invicta Football League season was the second in the history of the Kent Invicta Football League, a football competition in England.

League table

The league featured 15 clubs which competed in the division last season along with two new clubs:
Crown Alexandra, joined from the South London Alliance
Eltham Palace, joined from the Kent County League

Also, Erith & Dartford Town changed their name to Kent Football United.

League table

Results

References

External links
 Kent Invicta Football League

Kent Invicta Football League seasons
10